The Karachi Yacht Club, formerly known as Karachi Sailing Club, is a yacht club located in Karachi, Sindh, Pakistan.

History 
It was founded in 1911 as Karachi Sailing Club. The Club's premises were originally situated at Manora.

See also 
 Karachi Boat Club
 Yacht club

References

External links 
 Karachi Yacht Club - Official site
Pakistan Sailing Federation

1911 establishments in British India
Yacht clubs in Asia
Sports venues in Karachi
Organisations based in Karachi